Jack Imperato (born February 20, 2002) is an American professional soccer player who plays as a midfielder.

Club career
Born in Dallas, Texas, Imperato moved with his family to San Jose, California when he was 12 years old. He joined U.S. Soccer Development Academy side De Anza Force academy in 2015. In 2018, Imperato was scouted during a tournament with De Anza and went on a trial with Spanish club Villarreal before joining their youth system. During the 2019–20 season, Imperato was sent out on loan to Roda, a partnered club with Villarreal.

Orange County SC
On April 7, 2021, Imperato returned to the United States and joined USL Championship club Orange County SC. He made his professional debut for the club on May 16, 2021 against Tacoma Defiance, coming on as an 80th minute substitute in a 1–0 defeat.

Real Monarchs
Imperato signed with Real Salt Lake's MLS Next Pro affiliate Real Monarchs on February 4, 2022.

International career
Imperato has represented the United States at the under-14, under-15, and under-17 levels.

Career statistics

Honors
Orange County SC
USL Cup: 2021

References

External links
 Profile at Orange County SC

2002 births
Living people
American soccer players
Association football midfielders
Orange County SC players
Real Monarchs players
USL Championship players
Soccer players from Dallas
Soccer players from California
United States men's youth international soccer players
American expatriate soccer players
Expatriate footballers in Spain
MLS Next Pro players
De Anza Force players